The Courtesans Reply is a poetry pamphlet written by Shazea Quraishi, published as part of flipped eye publishing’s flap series. The work is no. 7 in the series. Quraishi’s poetry had been published in UK and US anthologies and journals, including Ten (Bloodaxe), The Financial Times, Poetry Review, Modern Poetry in Translation and PN Review.

The Courtesans Reply is a long poem sequence voiced by Indian courtesans. The work consists of 16 poems divided into two parts. The collection draws inspiration from the monologue plays of The Caturbhānī and The Complete Kāma Sūtra, and from historical findings. The poems detail the relationships between the courtesans and their lovers, as well as traditional activities performed by the courtesans, such as dancing and storytelling. The collection is currently being adapted as a play, and is also included in the Quraishi's second work, The Art of Scratching.

Poems

‘Tambulasena’ begins in the style of the creation myth, describing the hardened state of the speaker, and continues to focus on a metaphorical physical state. The speaker’s male lover alters her state and shapes her. The final image of the lover climbing the speaker’s hair like a rope emphasises the fantastical in this poem. Like in most of the poems in Quraishi’s collection, eroticism and sexuality are predominant themes. Both the male and female gazes are also addressed.

‘Sukumarika’ is addressed to the courtesan speaker’s lover, Ramasena, begging him to remember the loving and erotic relationship they shared. The kiss becomes the key motif in this poem, repeated in the listing of different types of kisses, such as ‘the devouring kiss’ and ‘the delicate kiss’. This is a motif repeated throughout the work.

‘Pradymnadasi’ is about the sensual experience of erotic biting and the mutual pleasure shared between lovers. The speaker suggests that bite marks left by her lover are as valuable and beautiful as precious stones and jewellery. The poem consists of four stanzas of tercets.

Contents

 The Sixty-Four Arts
 Tambulasena
 Vanarajika
 Ramadasi
 The Days of Chandragupta Maurya
 Sukumarika
 Priyangusena
 Ratisena
 Messenger
 Madhavesana
 Sondasi
 Pradymnadasi
 Devadatta
 Carandasi
 Anangadatta
 Epilogue

References

2012 poetry books
2012 poems